In set theory and in the context of a large cardinal property, a subset, S, of D is homogeneous for a function f if f is constant in finite subsets of S. More precisely, given a set D, let  be the set of all finite subsets of D (see Powerset#Subsets of limited cardinality) and let  be a function defined in this set. On these conditions, S is homogeneous for f if, for every natural number n, f is constant in the set . That is, f is constant on the unordered n-tuples of elements of S.

See also
Ramsey's theorem
Ramsey_cardinal

Large cardinals